Philippe "Bouli" Lanners (born 20 May 1965) is a Belgian actor, author and film director. His film The Giants was nominated for twelve Magritte Awards, winning five, including Best Film and Best Director.

Biography
Lanners was born on 20 May 1965 in Moresnet-Chapelle, Belgium. His mother was a cleaning lady and his father was a customs agent. He spent a year at the Royal Academy of Fine Arts in Liège, after which he continued to paint while doing odd jobs until turning his attention to cinema at the turn of the century.

Filmography

As actor

As director & writer

As producer

References

External links

1965 births
Living people
20th-century Belgian male actors
21st-century Belgian male actors
Belgian film directors
Belgian male film actors
Belgian screenwriters
Magritte Award winners
People from Plombières
Walloon people
Best Supporting Actor César Award winners